Nepal has been mining in small scale for iron, copper, lead, zinc, cobalt, nickel and gold. Old mine pits, adits, smelting places and other remnant of mine processing are found all over Nepal. Some village are sometimes named after mineral names such as Taba Khani, Falam Khani, Shisa Khani or Sun Khani.</ref> <name=/>

Before 1951 (2007BS) Nepal was an exporter of iron and copper to Tibet and cobalt to India. At Thoshe iron deposit (Ramechhap), a gun manufacturing plant was established in 1921 which is non-functional now. After the change of government in 1951, mining activities gradually closed.

Systematic geological mapping and mineral exploration were done by the Nepal Bureau of Mines that was established in 1961 and Nepal Geological Survey that was established in 1967. These two organizations were combined in 1977 and renamed as Department of Mines and Geology (DMG). Mineral exploration activities were in peak during 1969 – 1984. Some potential mineral resources identified by the exploration are listed below.

Metallic mineral

Non-metallic mineral

References

Mining in Nepal